The Our Lady of the Philippines Monastery is a Trappist monastery on Jordan, Guimaras, Guimaras, Philippines and is the only Trappist monastery in the country. It was founded in 1972 and at present, there are 35 monks living in the monastery. They produce a number of products, selling under the brand "Trappist Monastic Products", including pineapple and mango jams, which can be found in local stores and at their shop. The monastery is also available for retreats. It is popular stop for tourists visiting Guimaras.

Their abbot is Filomeno Cinco.

References

External links
 

20th-century Christian monasteries
Christian monasteries in the Philippines
Trappist monasteries
Buildings and structures in Guimaras
20th-century religious buildings and structures in the Philippines